The 1971–72 Kansas Jayhawks men's basketball team represented the University of Kansas during the 1971–72 college men's basketball season.

Roster
Bud Stallworth
Tom Kivisto
Randy Canfield
Aubrey Nash
Wilson Barrow
Dave Taynor
Neal Mask
Mark Mathews
Fred Bosilevac Jr.
Dale Haase
Ken Franklin
Randy Culberston
Jerry House

Schedule

Statistics
Leading scorers
Bud Stallworth (6-5 Sr F)  25.3
Tom Kivisto (6-3 So G) 8.9
Randy Canfield (6-9 Jr C) 7.6
Aubrey Nash (6-1 Sr G) 6.7
Wilson Barrow (6-6 Jr F) 6.4

References

Kansas Jayhawks men's basketball seasons
Kansas Jayhawks
Kansas State
Kansas State